Liparis petricola, commonly known as the mountain sprite orchid, is a plant in the orchid family and is endemic to Queensland. It is a terrestrial orchid with two or three egg-shaped leaves and between three and fifteen deep reddish purple flowers with a green column. It grows in rainforest in tropical far North Queensland.

Description
Liparis petricola is a terrestrial herb with three or four underground pseudobulbs. The labellum is egg-shaped with the narrower end towards the base, a channelled base and irregular edges. Flowering occurs between October and December.

Taxonomy and naming
The mountain sprite orchid was first formally described in 2006 by David Jones and Bruce Gray who gave it the name Diteilis petricola and published the description in Australian Orchid Research. In 2008, Peter Dundas Bostock changed the name to Liparis petricola. The specific epithet (petricola) is derived from the Ancient Greek word petra meaning "rock" or "stone" and the suffix -cola meaning "dweller" or "inhabitant".

Distribution and habitat
Liparis petricola grows in rainforest, often in leaf litter on large granite boulders and is found between Kuranda and the Kirrama National Park.

References

petricola
Orchids of Queensland
Plants described in 2006